Joana Hählen (born 23 January 1992) is a Swiss World Cup alpine ski racer, specializing in the speed events of Downhill and Super-G.

Born in Belp in the canton of Bern, Hählen made her World Cup debut in November 2013, gained her first podium in February 2019, and has competed in two World Championships.

Biography 
Joana Hählen believed she would reach her first World Cup podium when she finished second in the Crans Montana downhill on February 23, 2019, 49/100ths of a second behind Sofia Goggia, but due to several timing errors during the race, she was finally placed fourth a few days later. In the following season, on January 24, 2020, she finally got her first podium, finishing third in the first run in Bansko behind Mikaela Shiffrin and Federica Brignone. A week later she achieved a second podium, her last to date, at the Super G in Rosa Khutor.

During the Garmisch downhill in January 2022, she achieved intermediate times that allowed her to think she would join her compatriots Corinne Suter and Jasmine Flury on the podium, but she made an incomprehensible mistake in the last meters of the course and only finished in 8th place. 

She was part of the Swiss team that went to Beijing for the Olympic Games, but had to go through internal selections on site to obtain the right to compete for the first time in an Olympic event. She was not selected for the Super G but, by achieving the best time in the last training session, she won her place for the downhill, which she finished in 6th place.

World Cup results

Season standings
{| class=wikitable style="text-align:center"
!Season !! Age !!  Overall  !!  Slalom  !! Giant slalom  !! Super-G !! Downhill !!Combined
|-
| 2014 ||22|| 97 || — || — || — || 38 || — 
|-
| 2015 ||23|| colspan=6| 
|-
| 2016 ||24|| 68 || — || — || 33 || 28 || 49
|-
| 2017 ||25|| 62 || — || — ||23 || 38 || 36 
|-
| 2018 ||26|| 39 || — || — ||14 || 33 || — 
|-
| 2019 ||27|| 34 || — || — ||13 || 16 || — 
|-
| 2020 ||28|| 21 || — || — ||13 || 14 || 14 
|-
| 2021 ||29|| 48 || — || — ||21 || 26 || rowspan="3" 
|-
| 2022 ||30||24||— ||—||18||13
|-
| 2023 ||31||24||—||—||13||13|}

Race podiums
0 wins
4 podiums – (2 DH, 2 SG); 21 top tens 

World Championship results

Olympic results

References

External links

Swiss Ski team – official site –  ''

1992 births
Living people
Swiss female alpine skiers
Alpine skiers at the 2022 Winter Olympics
Olympic alpine skiers of Switzerland
Sportspeople from the canton of Bern
21st-century Swiss women